0K (zero K) or 0-K may refer to:
0k, an abbreviation for zero killed (used by bombers during World War II)
0K, an abbreviation for the temperature zero Kelvin, or Absolute zero
0K, an abbreviation for Zero knowledge in cryptology
Zero-knowledge proof
Non-interactive zero-knowledge proof
Zero-knowledge password proof
0K, an abbreviation for zero keel, a type of Suspension keel
Zero-K, an open source real time strategy game
 Zero K, a novel by Don DeLillo
Zero K, Music producer

See also
K0 (disambiguation)